The 48th United States Colored Infantry Regiment was a U.S.C.T. infantry regiment in the Union Army during the American Civil War. It was organized from the 10th Louisiana Infantry (African Descent) in March 1864 and fought in the Gulf Coast areas as part of the Department of the Gulf. It participated in the Battle of Fort Blakely in April 1865, after which it served in various garrison roles in Texas until it was mustered out on January 4, 1866. During its time of service the regiment lost three officers and 59 enlisted men killed and mortally wounded and one officer and 464 enlisted men died of disease, for a total of 527.

See also
List of United States Colored Troops Civil War units

Sources
An abbreviated history of the 48th United States Colored Troops Infantry Regiment

United States Colored Troops Civil War units and formations
Military units and formations established in 1864
1864 establishments in Louisiana
Military units and formations disestablished in 1866

Led by Col. Frederick Mortimer Crandal, Col. 48th U.S. Colored Infantry, 8 Aug 1863; B1-D1-USCT District of Vicksburg - Dept. of the Miss. 17 Feb - 19 May 1865; B1-D1-Dist. Of West Fla-Mil Div of West Miss., 14 May 1865-June 1865; Brevet Brigadier General, 24 Oct 1865   When the 48th United States Colored Infantry unit was established from the 10th Louisiana Infantry in March 1864, he was promoted to Colonel and assigned as the regiment's commander. He led his unit in the assault and capture of Fort Blakely, Alabama in early April 1865. On March 13, 1865 he was brevetted Brigadier General, US Volunteers for "gallant and meritorious services." He remained in the United States Army after the war, retiring as a Lt Col.  in 1895. (bio by: Thomas Fisher) <Civil War High Commands
https://books.google.com/books?isbn=0804780358 Page 189ref> </Herringshaw's American Blue-book of Biography: Prominent Americans ...
https://books.google.com/books?id=4IxIAAAAYAAJ page 254 ref>